The 1941–42 Coppa Italia was the 9th Coppa Italia, the major Italian domestic cup. The competition was won by Juventus.

Due to WW2, Serie C clubs were excluded.

Serie B elimination round

Round of 32

Round of 16

Quarter-finals

Semi-finals

Final

First leg

Second leg 

Juventus won 5–2 on aggregate.

Top goalscorers

External links
rsssf.com

Coppa Italia seasons
1941–42 domestic association football cups
Coppa